Cushite may refer to:
the historical Kingdom of Kush
an ethnolinguistic group indigenous to Northeast Africa, see Cushitic languages
a biblical tribal name, see Cush (Bible)
the natives of the Horn of Africa region, see Ethiopid race

See also
Cushi, Hebrew Bible term for dark-skinned African
, wife of Moses
Hamites

Language and nationality disambiguation pages